Norwell is a village and parish about  from Newark-on-Trent, in central Nottinghamshire, England. The population (including Norwell Woodhouse) at the 2011 census was 490.

History

Early History
"Nortwelle" is mentioned in Domesday Book (1086); it had a church, a priest and a watermill. The parish consists of Norwell, Norwell Woodhouse, and the now deserted village of Willoughby.  For nearly a thousand years the parish of Norwell was owned by the church.  Rents from land and houses were used to finance three canons (or prebendaries) of Southwell. The canons were the principal landlords and lived in moated manor houses: Overhall, Palishall and Tertia Pars. In the Middle Ages some prebendaries were national figures, such as Robert de Wodehouse (died 1346) who became treasurer of England.

Farming
In other respects Norwell was a typical farming community. Traces of the medieval open fields, with their ridge and furrow, may still be seen. Major changes followed parliamentary enclosure (1832) when the land was divided into small fields. Many small farms, possibly 28, were established, some in the village centre and others in outlying fields. Today there are a few large farms and no working farms in the village centre. Some old farmyards in the village like Church, Willoughby and Hill farms have been developed for new homes.

Self-sufficiency
19th century Norwell was almost self-sufficient. Blacksmiths, wheelwrights, stonemasons, and builders were often grouped together in yards leading off the main street. There were two windmills, two steam mills and a watermill. For a time Norwell had its own brickworks. Personal needs were met by General stores, bakers and butchers, shoemakers and a tailor. There were at least three public houses; The Black Horse, The Crown (later The Elephant and Castle) and The Plough. Norwell has had a school since 1727.

Buildings
The medieval church of St Laurence is Grade 1 listed and has features from the 12th to the 20th century. Almost all of the buildings are of red brick with pantiles. There are many timber framed buildings originally with mud and stud between the timbers. Most are now entirely encased in brick but the timber can still be seen internally. There are a few striking 19th century houses, most of which were built by Henry Clipsham, the Norwell builder who also restored the Church. A windmill and distinctive circular pinfold can still be seen.

Norwell now
The population of the parish is about 450, much as it was around 1250 and 1700. It reached its peak in the 1860s when it was nearly 800.

Norwell Buildings

St. Laurence Church

Brief history
The first church in Norwell was almost certainly a wooden one, probably erected as a chapel attached to an Anglo-Saxon manor house standing on or near where a later moated manor house was built, immediately to the south of the present church. This may have been the church, with its priest, mentioned in Domesday, but no traces of that chapel or church remain. Shortly after 1100 it was certainly replaced by a small rectangular building like that surviving at Littleborough, Nottinghamshire. Fragmented masonry associated with this first stone church has been identified in the north aisle.

During the 12th and 13th centuries other traces were lost through major work creating the church we now see. Around 1180–1200, the south aisle was added and the south door moved to its present position. A tower with three storeys was built shortly after 1200 and by 1250 the north aisle was added. A further expansion took place around 1300, partly paid for by a legacy from Mr John Clarell, prebendary of Overhall (d.1295). The north and south transepts were added, the Chancel lengthened and, a few years later, the south porch built. Finally between about 1450 and 1500, the nave was heightened with a clerestory (a row of flat-headed windows) inserted, the transepts and Chancel were re-roofed and a fourth storey with battlements an gargoyles added to the tower. The 19th century, largely sympathetic, restoration (Chancel, 1857-8, rest of church, 1872-5) by Ewan Christian faithfully preserves St Laurence's medieval appearance. The only major structural change was that Christian restored the Chancel to its 13th century form by removing the low pitched roof that was part of the 15th century refurbishment.

Evidence from the church shows the wide variety of stone available in medieval Norwell. Much of the building is constructed in skerry, a form of pale grey sandstone, quarried locally at Tuxford, Laxton, Kneesall and Maplebeck. Magnesium limestone was brought from Mansfield and other limestone came from Ancaster in Lincolnshire, whilst local lias from Collingham and a light porous tufa, which outcrops in The Beck between Norwell and Caunton, has been identified. For high-quality monuments like tombs and effigies stone was sometimes imported over much longer distances like the Purbeck marble and Caen stone also present.

Methodist Chapel
The Primitive Methodist Chapel was built on land donated by Revd W.Sturtevant in 1827. In 1843 this chapel was bought by the Wesleyans, who re-opened it on 6 November. This flourished and was enlarged in 1909, with a school room built by Henry Clipsham & Sons at a cost of £337. It became a private house in 1991.

Norwell Schools

Three school buildings still stand in School Lane. The charity school, a Grade II listed building, has been sold, thoroughly restored to maintain many original features and is in private ownership. Since 1966 the Victorian School has been used as a youth centre and, currently, by Norwell scouts, still fulfilling the original charity requirement that it was for the benefit of the young of Norwell. It is showing its age and will require restoration work to keep it in good order. The modern school continues to change and extra rooms have been added in response to evolving requirements for the education of young children.

The Charity School
The first mention of a school in Norwell is in a grant by Thomas Sturtevent of Palishall in 1727 when he gave 4 acres of land at Holme to the Trustees of the Charity School of Norwell on condition that they pay £3 per year out of the rents thereof as a yearly stipend for his trouble in teaching six children elected by the trustees. This has often been taken to mean that the school itself was founded in 1727. However, the wording implies that the school was already set up with a schoolmaster in post. If so it was probably a private school beyond the means of poorer inhabitants, hence Sturtevent's endowment for six children to be taught.

The architectural style of the building, particularly the mannerist doorway, supports the idea that it may have been built by 1700 or soon afterwards. In any event the school was definitely operational in 1727

The school building as it exists today is an L-shape. On the ground floor there were two rooms. This would have made it possible for two classes to be taught, probably with the master in one room and his wife, the mistress, teaching in the other. Three rooms above the schoolrooms were probably reached by an outside staircase. The upper rooms may have been used as a dormitory for a small number of pupils, although there is no record of pupils from any distance attending the school.

The wing running northwards formed the living accommodation for the master and his wife. This was added towards the end of the 18th century. The school was replaced in 1872 by The National School following legislation for full-time education.

The Victorian School
The Trustees [of The Charity School] met in spring 1870 to consider the future of the school which was both small and in a poor state of repair. They proposed that alterations should be put in hand. Speaker [of the House of Commons] Denison suggested that it would be better to provide a completely new school and he offered to find half the cost whatever it might be. This generous offer was sufficient to convince the other trustees. An architect was appointed to draw up plans for a new school for 120 pupils.

It was agreed to spend £500 on the new school so long as the money for it could be raised. The site chosen for this new building was on land adjoining the existing school. An additional piece of land fronting School Lane was conveyed by the Ecclesiastical Commissioners to the vicar and churchwardens as trustees.

The plans for the new school are most beautifully executed. The exterior could almost be that of a typical Victorian church with Gothic windows and fine tracery. It was to be made of red brick with Ancaster stone dressings. The asymmetry of the South elevation is a compromise between a central door and a fireplace and chimney also as near to the centre as possible. The interior is equally traditional; there is just one large room with a very high roof. The design suggests that there were three sections to the room. The school log book refers to a gallery which appears to have been at the west end.

Henry Clipsham, the builder, was on hand and available. He had moved to Norwell in 1857 for the restoration of St Laurence's and had set up his business, particularly specialising in building vicarages and schools. Work commenced in 1871.

There were great celebrations when the first stone was laid. The church bells were rung and the Union Jack flew on the church tower. A church service was followed by a procession to the school with everyone singing Onward Christian Soldiers. Placed underneath the first stone was a bottle containing a parchment with the wording:
"The corner stone of this school was laid on Easter Monday, 10 April 1871 by the Rt. Hon. J.E.Denison. M.P, Speaker of the House of Commons. Trustees: Evelyn Denison, 1st Viscount Ossington |Rt. Hon. J.E.Denison, M.P., Ossington, John Vere Esq. Carlton on Trent, Rev. James Maxfield, Vicar of Norwell with Carlton, Rev. Samuel Reynolds Hole, Caunton Manor, Joseph Templeman, South Drain House, Joseph Curtis, Norwell, George Esam, South Field. Principle contributors, Rt. Hon. the Speaker, £200, Ecclesiastical Commissioners for the Church of England £200, Educational department £100. William Bolton, Schoolmaster, Hannah Bolton, Schoolmistress. Henry Clipsham, Builder."

The ceremony was followed by tea, sports and games, and finally a magic lantern show by Mr Bolton.

By the late 1890s the building was no longer large enough, and there were problems with teaching infants and the older children in the same room. Inspectors complained that the accommodation was inadequate. In September 1893 tenders were invited for building a new classroom, cloakrooms and outhouses. The school was enlarged at a cost of £230. The new room which provided accommodation for the infants was attached at right angles to the west end of the school partially obscuring the porch.

The school continued to be improved throughout the first half of the 20th century. The outside offices were a constant source of displeasure to pupils and inspectors alike. In 1905 an official visitor commented that the offices are in an unsatisfactory state. They should be cleaned out regularly – at least once a fortnight and once a week in summer. In June 1907 one of His Majesty's Inspectors reported The school is without a lavatory. Clearly these words were heeded as the Head Teacher wrote in October, presumably with some relief, The school has been supplied with towels, soap, and a water-can for use with the new lavatory"". The school must have felt truly modernised in 1946 when electric light was installed!

Finally it was decided in1965 that a new school building was needed and nearly a century of education in the Victorian School drew to a close.

In December 2018 the building was offered for sale by the Trustee’s and sold in 2019 with permission having been granted for change of use to a private dwelling.

The Modern School
In the middle of the 20th century yet more changes were taking place in education. Elementary schools for pupils of 5 to 14, with just a few taking the scholarship examination and going on to grammar schools or technical schools, were replaced in Nottinghamshire by primary schools for 5 to 11-year olds and secondary schools for those over 11. The school leaving age was also raised to 15. At primary schools children were taught in smaller groups by their own teacher. The arrangement of the rooms in the Victorian school did not adapt well to this type of teaching.
There were problems with heating and ventilation. The Local Education Authority agreed to provide a new school serving Norwell, Norwell Woodhouse, Ossington, Moorhouse and part of Carlton on Trent. Building started on the new school in March 1965 on a site in School Lane opposite the Victorian School on land acquired by the LocalAuthority and the Diocese. The construction of it, too, was typical of its time. It was built in the C.L.A.S.P. System by Messrs Ashley of Mansfield Woodhouse.

It is best described by using the words on the leaflet produced for the official opening ceremony on Friday, 4 November 1966, by Lt. Col. W M E Denison:

"The school, which is designed for 70 pupils, has three classrooms grouped around a small assembly hall. The hall is separated from one of the classrooms by a partition which can be folded back to give extra space when required. Each classroom has its own toilet and cloakroom facilities, and an outside door opening into a small lobby, useful for growing plants and keeping pets. Storage spaces for chairs and physical education apparatus are incorporated into the hall which is also used for dining and has a modern kitchen adjoining it. A staffroom completes the accommodation."

How different from the Victorian school! The toilet facilities must have delighted those familiar with the provision in their previous school. The design for 70 pupils reflects the changing population in the area; not just a fall in population but in the structure of families with a smaller number of children.

Norwell School has had a relationship with Ossington over the years. Speaker Denison, as well as being much involved in the building of the Victorian school in Norwell also established a school in Ossington in 1826. In 1941 this school was closed and demolished to make way for an RAF airfield (RAF Ossington), and Ossington pupils and teachers were transferred to Norwell. With these connections it was only fitting that as Speaker Denison had presided over the opening of the Victorian school in 1871 so his great nephew should do the same in 1966.

Material is reproduced with permission of Norwell Parish Heritage Group.

The Pinfold

The village pinfold or pound is located on Bathley Lane (west side) close to its junction with Main Street and Woodhouse Road. The 18th century circular structure is of brick with half round ashlar copings with a pair of square gate pillars with ashlar capitals. The wooden gate is 20th century. The pinfold is approximately 10m (33') in diameter and is reputedly the largest round pinfold in the county (Nottinghamshire).

The structure is Grade II listed by Historic England (listing number 1045950).

An attached plaque carries the inscription:

PINFOLD
BUILT CIRCA 1830
TO REPLACE AN EARLIER
WOODEN PINFOLD USED TO
PEN STRAY ANIMALS WHICH
COULD THEN BE RECLAIMED
ON PAYMENT OF A FINE
TO THE PINDER
[Signed] NORWELL PARISH COUNCIL

The Tower Mill/Steam Mill

A date stone suggests that Norwell's tower windmill, in Main Street, was built in 1852. It is a five-storey brick tower, standing 43' (13.5m) high to the curb, with Yorkshire sliding windows. The cap was a typical ogee shape and probably originally covered in iron plates. There were three pairs of millstones on the first floor, overdriven by a wooden upright shaft in wooden bearings. The stones could be disengaged by means of elm glut boxes (glut box timbers have a slot cut in them to allow the top of the quant (the vertical shaft) to be removed, enabling the stone nuts (pinions), and hence the millstone to be disengaged from the great spur wheel).

The mill had four sails which used the Cubitt patent system of a striking lever to the rear so that the shutters could be furled by only removing the weight from the chain to the striking lever. It was winded by a fantail which served to turn the main sails of the mill automatically into the wind.

On the ground floor there was a hurst frame supporting two pairs of stones which were driven by a layshaft from a steam engine and later a mobile oil engine. A layshaft to the mill, the bearing stone block and cast iron boxes for the bearings were present in 1977.

A 1910 description, which was part of a national survey to establish a new property tax, states that the Mill House was in good repair, with two living rooms, kitchen, dairy, and three bedrooms. Outside there was a coal house, an outside privy, a stable (with two stalls), chaff house, cart shed, bake house, engine shed (wood, iron), and a mill powered by steam and wind in good repair. The whole property was assessed at a market value of £480 of which buildings accounted for £420.

Plans to restore the Tower Mill have failed and Planning permission has been granted to convert the building into a dwelling integrated into the existing 1970’s bungalow alongside.

Transport

Road
Norwell roads including Main Street, Carlton Road, Ossington Road, Bathley Lane and Woodhouse Road are unclassified. The speed limit through the village is 30 mph with an advisory 20 mph along part of Main Street due to the proximity of the school.

The A1 Trunk Road (Cromwell Bypass) passes the parish approximately 1.5 miles to the east of Norwell.  Although not within the parish it is of interest that Cromwell Bypass was the location of highly collaborative trials of the slip-form paver in 1964/65. The first such machine to be brought into the UK was used to trial the laying of unreinforced and reinforced concrete carriageways with dowelled contraction and expansion joints. The surface has now been rebuilt using tarmac (asphalt concrete). The A616 road passes approximately 2 miles to the west of Norwell.

Rail
The East Coast Main Line crosses the east of the parish in an approximately north/south direction, passing approximately 1 mile to the east of the village itself.

The nearest railway stations are in Newark-on-Trent, seven miles to the south-east. Newark North Gate is located on the East Coast Main Line, between London King's Cross and Edinburgh Waverley, and Newark Castle is located on the Nottingham to Lincoln line.

References

External links

Community website http://norwell-online.org.uk
 http://southwellchurches.nottingham.ac.uk

Villages in Nottinghamshire
Newark and Sherwood